Events from the year 1150 in Ireland.

Incumbents
High King: Toirdelbach Ua Conchobair

Events

Births
John de Courcy (also John de Courci) (d. 1219), an Anglo-Norman knight who arrived in Ireland in 1176.

References